Duke of Rutland is a title in the Peerage of England, named after Rutland, a county in the East Midlands of England. Earldoms named after Rutland have been created three times; the ninth earl of the third creation was made duke in 1703, in whose family's line the title continues.  The heir apparent to the dukedom has the privilege of using the courtesy style/title of the Marquis/Marquess of Granby.

Earldom of Rutland

First creation
The title Earl of Rutland was created on 25 February 1390 for Edward of Norwich (1373–1415), son of Edmund of Langley, 1st Duke of York, and grandson of King Edward III. Upon the Duke's death in 1402 Edward became Duke of York. The title Earl of Rutland fell into disuse upon his death at the Battle of Agincourt, and was assumed by other members of the House of York including the first earl's nephew Richard Plantagenet, 3rd Duke of York, the father of King Edward IV.

Second creation
The title Earl of Rutland was created on 29 January 1446 for Edmund (1443–1460), second son of Richard Plantagenet, 3rd Duke of York (and younger brother of the future King Edward IV).

Third creation
Thomas Manners (c. 1488–1543), son of the 11th Baron de Ros of Hamlake, Truibut and Belvoir, was created Earl of Rutland in the Peerage of England in 1525. He was the great-grandson of Richard Plantagenet. The barony of 'de Ros of Hamlake, Truibut and Belvoir' (sometimes spelt Ros, Roos or de Roos) was created by Simon de Montfort with a writ of summons to the House of Lords for Robert de Ros (1223–1285) in 1264.  The title may pass through the female line when there is no male heir, and accordingly, when the 3rd Earl, Edward Manners (c. 1548–1587), left no sons, the barony of Ros passed to the family of his daughter Elizabeth (died 1591) who became the wife of the 2nd Earl of Exeter. The 3rd Earl was succeeded as the 4th Earl by his brother John (died 1588). The barony of Ros was restored to the Manners family when Francis Manners, the 6th Earl (1578–1632), inherited it in 1618 from his cousin William Cecil (1590–1618). However, Francis died without male issue and the assumption of the courtesy title of Lord Ros for the eldest son of subsequent earls appears to have had no legal basis. On the death of the seventh Earl in 1641 the Earldom passed to his distant cousin John Manners of Haddon Hall, grandson of the second son of the first Earl.

Dukedom of Rutland

In 1703, the ninth Earl of Rutland was created Duke of Rutland and Marquess of Granby by Queen Anne.

Marquess of Granby
The most notable Marquess of Granby was John Manners (1721–1770), eldest son of the third Duke. He was an accomplished soldier and highly popular figure of his time; in 1745 he became a colonel; his military career flourished during the Seven Years' War.

At the Battle of Minden (1 August 1759), although his role was small, he commanded the reserve cavalry. In 1760, at the Battle of Warburg, he led a cavalry charge which routed the French, losing his hat and wig in the process. In recognition of this, soldiers of the Blues and Royals (his former regiment) have the unique privilege in the British Army of being permitted to salute while not wearing headgear.  Granby's losing his helmet and wig in the charge gave rise to the expression 'going bald-headed' at something.

In 1758, the King made him Colonel of the Royal Horse Guards and in 1766, as Lieutenant-General, he became Commander-in-Chief (a basically political appointment). His title was honoured by being used by a large number of pubs throughout Britain, although the reason is little known. As Colonel, he provided for his most capable soldiers such that when they could no longer be of service to the Regiment, he would give them financial support to start a pub, the sole condition being that the pub was to be named "The Marquis of Granby" after him. The towns of Granby, Quebec in Canada and Granby, Massachusetts and Granby, Connecticut in the United States as well as Granby Street in Norfolk, Virginia, USA were also named after him. so too were two forts, Fort Granby, in Tobago, and Fort Granby in South Carolina.

He died before his father, and therefore did not become Duke.

Subsidiary titles
The subsidiary titles of the dukedom are: Marquess of Granby (created 1703), Earl of Rutland (1525), Baron Manners, of Haddon in the County of Derby (1679), and Baron Roos of Belvoir, of Belvoir in the County of Leicester (1896). The title Baron Roos of Belvoir is in the Peerage of the United Kingdom; the remaining titles being in the Peerage of England. The most senior subsidiary title, Marquess of Granby, is the courtesy title used by the Duke's eldest son and heir.

Family seat

The Manners family own medieval Haddon Hall, Derbyshire and Belvoir Castle, Leicestershire that were successively extended and rebuilt until the 19th century.  Some rooms in both buildings are open to the public.  They are Grade I in architecture, set in listed parks, woodland and gardens and span a central water feature, which acted as models for other landscaped estates.

In 2009, to mark 500 years of the occupancy of Belvoir Castle by the family two aircraft from RAF Cranwell, Lincolnshire, bore the Duke of Rutland's Coat of Arms. On 11 June 2009, the Duke visited the station to see the aircraft—a King Air from 45 (Reserve) Sqn and a Dominie from 55 (Reserve) Sdn.

Burials
The traditional burial place of the Manners family was St Mary the Virgin's Church, Bottesford. Since elevation to the dukedom in 1703 most Dukes have been buried in the grounds of the mausoleum at Belvoir Castle. The mausoleum at Belvoir Castle was built by John Henry Manners, 5th Duke of Rutland, following the death of his wife, Elizabeth Howard (1780–1825), daughter of the 5th Earl of Carlisle. After its construction, most of the 18th-century monuments in Belton Church were moved to the mausoleum which then became the family's main place of burial.

Literature
Jorge Luis Borges recalls the duke of Rutland in his story "A Survey of the Works of Herbet Quain" in the book The Garden of Forking Paths.

Earls of Rutland, first creation (1390)
Other titles (1st Duke): Duke of York (1385), Duke of Aumale (1397–1399), Earl of Cambridge (1362–1461), Earl of Cork (c. 1396)
Edward of Norwich, 2nd Duke of York (1373–1415), grandson of Edward III
Richard Plantagenet, 3rd Duke of York (1411–1460), nephew of Edward of Norwich

Earls of Rutland, second creation (1446)
Edmund, Earl of Rutland (1443–1460), second son of Richard Plantagenet, 3rd Duke of York

Earls of Rutland, third creation (1525)
Other titles (1st–3rd & 6th Earls): Baron de Ros of Helmsley (1299)
Thomas Manners, 1st Earl of Rutland (c. 1492–1543), son of George Manners, 11th Baron de Ros
Henry Manners, 2nd Earl of Rutland (c. 1526–1563), eldest son of the 1st Earl
Edward Manners, 3rd Earl of Rutland (1549–1587), elder son of the 2nd Earl, died without male issue
John Manners, 4th Earl of Rutland (c. 1552–1588), younger son of the 2nd Earl
Roger Manners, 5th Earl of Rutland (1576–1612), eldest son of the 4th Earl, died without issue
Francis Manners, 6th Earl of Rutland, Lord Ros (1578–1632), second son of the 4th Earl, died without male issue
George Manners, 7th Earl of Rutland (1580–1641), third son of the 4th Earl, died without issue
John Manners, 8th Earl of Rutland (1604–1679), great-grandson of the 1st Earl
John Manners, 9th Earl of Rutland (1638–1711), son of the 8th Earl, created Duke of Rutland in 1703

Dukes of Rutland (1703)

Other titles: Marquis of Granby (1703), Earl of Rutland (1525), Baron Manners of Haddon (1679) and Baron Roos of Belvoir (1896)
John Manners, 1st Duke of Rutland (1638–1711), only son of the 8th Earl
John Manners, 2nd Duke of Rutland (1676–1721), son of the 1st Duke
John Manners, 3rd Duke of Rutland (1696–1779), eldest son of the 2nd Duke
John Manners, Marquis of Granby (1721–1770), eldest son of the 3rd Duke, predeceased his father
John Manners, Lord Roos (1751–1760), eldest son of Lord Granby, died young
Charles Manners, 4th Duke of Rutland (1754–1787), second son of Lord Granby
John Henry Manners, 5th Duke of Rutland (1778–1857), eldest son of the 4th Duke
George John Henry Manners, Marquis of Granby (1807), eldest son of the 5th Duke, died in infancy
George John Frederick Manners, Marquis of Granby (1813–1814), second son of the 5th Duke, died in infancy
Charles Cecil John Manners, 6th Duke of Rutland (1815–1888), third son of the 5th Duke, died unmarried
John James Robert Manners, 7th Duke of Rutland (1818–1906), fourth son of the 5th Duke
Henry John Brinsley Manners, 8th Duke of Rutland (1852–1925), eldest son of the 7th Duke
Robert Charles John Manners, Lord Haddon (1885–1894), elder son of the 8th Duke, died young
John Henry Montagu Manners, 9th Duke of Rutland (1886–1940), younger son of the 8th Duke
Charles John Robert Manners, 10th Duke of Rutland (1919–1999), eldest son of the 9th Duke
David Charles Robert Manners, 11th Duke of Rutland (born 1959), eldest son of the 10th Duke

The heir apparent is Charles John Montague Manners, Marquess of Granby (born 1999), elder son of the 11th Duke.

Line of Succession

     1.  Charles John Montague Manners, Marquess of Granby (born 1999), eldest son of the 11th Duke
     2.  Lord Hugo William James Manners (b. 2003), younger son of the 11th Duke
     3.  Lord Edward John Francis Manners (b. 1965), younger brother of the 11th Duke
     4.  Alfred Charles Nicholas Manners (b. 2013), eldest son of Lord Edward Manners
     5   Vesey Peter Michael Manners (b. 2013), youngest son of Lord Edward Manners and twin of Alfred Manners
     6.  Richard John Peverel Manners (b.1963), only son of Lord John Manners, 2nd son of the 9th Duke
     7.  John Frederick Manners (b. 1955), descended from George Manners-Sutton, 3rd son of the 3rd Duke
     8.  John Hugh Robert (Willie) Manners, 6th Baron Manners (b. 1956) descended from George Manners-Sutton, 3rd son of the 3rd Duke

(the male heirs of the 6th Baron Manners are also in the line of succession)

Coat of arms

The original coat of arms of the Manners family was plain gules in chief. The quartering in chief, with the fleurs-de-lis of France and lion passant guardant of England, was granted as an augmentation by King Henry VIII to Thomas Manners at the time of his creation as Earl of Rutland, in recognition of his descent in the maternal line from King Edward III.

Family tree

See also
Duchess of Rutland
Viscount Canterbury
Belvoir Castle
Baron Manners
Baron de Ros
Account of the Manners family in politics, and the naming of hostelries as blue in the vicinity

References

Further reading

External links
Belvoir Castle website

Borough of Melton
British landowners
Dukedoms in the Peerage of England
1525 establishments in England
1703 establishments in England
Noble titles created in 1703